Pseudostenidea rufescens is a species of beetle in the family Cerambycidae, and the only species in the genus Pseudostenidea. It was described by Breuning in 1953.

References

Apomecynini
Beetles described in 1953
Monotypic beetle genera